Albert Hetterle (31 October 1918 – 17 December 2006) was a German actor who also became intendant at the Maxim Gorki Theater in Berlin.

Early years
Albert Hetterle was born in Petersthal a few weeks after the First World War had ended. His father was a farmer. Petersthal was a small village near Odessa. It had been settled by Black Sea Germans a century or so earlier. Hetterle studied pedagogy and was also trained in acting by Ilse Fogarasi. In 1936 he became a trainee-actor with the Odessa Theatre Collective. This was a German-language traveling theatre company in the Odessa region. In 1937 he joined the same company as an actor. During the early 1940s Ukraine was occupied by Germany, and although fighting across much of the Reichskommissariat Ukraine region was savage, in Odessa, which in 1941 was administratively transferred to Transnistria, Hetterle was able to continue working in the German-language theatre. 

In 1944, however, as the tide of World War II turned against Germany, there was a massive relocation of ethnic Germans from central and eastern Europe towards the west: Hetterle moved to what would shortly be redesignated as the Soviet occupation zone within what remained of Germany. Along the way, at one stage during 1944, he was employed in Troppau as an official of the Hitler Youth organisation. He was briefly conscripted for military service, but early in 1945 he was released again for reasons of "serious illness".

From 1945 till 1947 he worked at the Chiemsee Peasant Theatre. Then, till 1949, his theatre career took him to Sondershausen, with subsequent engagements in Greifswald, Altenburg, Erfurt (1951–1953) and Halle (1953–1955).

Maxim Gorki Theater
For Hetterle, this was the start of a partnership with the Maxim Gorki Theater that would last for more than three decades.

From 1968 till 1994 Hetterle formed and developed the Maxim Gorki Theatre as its Intendant ("director"). His focus, especially after 1971, was on staging contemporary Soviet works, along with some of the classics. Examples included Maxim Gorky's Vassa Zheleznova (1970), The Lower Depths (1977), The Philistines (1982) and Barbarians (1987). His productions of the German classics included Lessing's Minna von Barnhelm and, from the western socialist repertoire various works by Juan Gelman. There were also guest productions in Karl-Marx-Stadt (as Chemnitz was then known) and Dresden.

During the 1980s the theatre under his direction increasingly staged plays by Soviet authors critical of the political "status quo" in Moscow and, by implicit extrapolation, in East Berlin. A decisive production, in 1988, was the play  (The Transition Society) by Volker Braun, in which the dramatist anticipated the demise of the East German dictatorship.

Screen work
Starting in the late 1950s, Hetterle also made frequent screen appearances in cinema and on television. This included a lead role in the television version of Die Übergangsgesellschaft which was shown on East German television during the country's actual transition year, 1990.

Selected filmography
 1955: Ernst Thälmann – Führer seiner Klasse
 1956: Drei Mädchen im Endspiel
 1956: Thomas Müntzer – Ein Film deutscher Geschichte
 1957: Spur in die Nacht
 1959: The Punch Bowl
 1960: Leute mit Flügeln
 1962: Das zweite Gleis
 1963: Geheimarchiv an der Elbe
 1965: Solange Leben in mir ist
 1972: Trotz alledem!
 1973: Das unsichtbare Visier (Television series)
 1979: Stine (TV)
 1979: Einfach Blumen aufs Dach
 1986: Der Hut des Brigadiers
 1990:  (Television version 1990)

Awards, honours and memberships
 1962 National Prize of East Germany for arts and literature
 1967 Became member of Berlin Party Leadership Team (SED-Bezirksleitung)
 1967 
 1977 National Prize of East Germany for arts and literature
 1978 Patriotic Order of Merit
 1993 Juror for the

References

External links

German male actors
German theatre directors
Recipients of the National Prize of East Germany
Recipients of the Patriotic Order of Merit
East German artists
Artists from Berlin
1918 births
2006 deaths
Hitler Youth members
German military personnel of World War II
Soviet emigrants to Germany